Charm School or charm school may refer to:
Charm school or finishing school, providing young women with training in the social graces
Charm School (Bishop Allen album), 2003
Charm School (Roxette album), 2011
Charm School (TV series), a reality television series airing on VH1
Charm School with Ricki Lake
 The Charm School (novel), a 1988 spy thriller novel by Nelson DeMille
 The Charm School (film), a lost 1921 American silent comedy film
 The Company of Youth, The Rank Organisation's shortly-lived talent school for its young contract players, popularly known as the Rank Charm School